Tempo School is a K-12 private school in the Riverbend neighbourhood of Edmonton, Alberta. It is a small academic school, with 450-525 students and 45 faculty members. The school's curriculum focuses on the academic studies and intellectual development of its students through traditional teaching methods.

History 
Tempo was founded in 1963 by Dr. George N. Cormack and was incorporated by the provincial Tempo School Act of 1967. It was initially located inside the Holy Trinity Church in Old Strathcona before moving to its present location in Riverbend in 1972 with 10 grades. The first class of Grade 12 students graduated in 1976, and a kindergarten was added in 2000.

Admission 
The school has more applicants than it accepts; interviews and tests, as well as past academic scores, are used to determine a student's eligibility.

Academics 
Tempo School offers a unique program of study focusing on sciences and humanities; athletics and fine arts are considered by the school to be the parents' responsibility. The school also expects its students to maintain a full course load based on a prescribed curriculum. French is a mandatory course taught from Grades 2 to 11, geography from Grades 3 to 11, English grammar from Grades 6 to 8, and Latin from Grades 7 to 9. The three major scientific fields, chemistry, biology, and physics, are taught as separate courses from Grade 7 on; as the Alberta government offers only a general Science course until Grade 11, the marks of Tempo's science courses are averaged into one Science mark until Grade 11. This prescribed curriculum is designed to give students a background in a variety of academic programs and, in high school, ensure that the Alberta diploma requirements are filled or exceeded for all students, as well as prepare them for post-secondary studies. As a result, the school enjoys the fourth-highest diploma exam average in the province as of 2015. Many high school courses at Tempo are taught at an Advanced Placement (AP) or International Baccalaureate (IB) level, and some prepare students for AP exams. Additionally, the school offers extracurricular AP classes in English, French, Latin, European History, Biology, Physics, Chemistry, Calculus, and Psychology, as well as courses in Computer Science and Linear Algebra. However, because of Tempo's small size and academic focus, limited electives are offered for credit. Physical Education is mandatory from Grades 7 to 9, and is offered as an elective at the 20 and 30 levels

Extracurricular activities 
A number of clubs are available at the school, including Coding, Young Engineers, Middle School Leadership, Math, Computers, Chess, Ski Club and AP Courses for the upper school student. From Grade 9 on, students can run for positions in the Student Council, which organizes sports tournaments, dances, hot lunches, volunteering opportunities, fundraisers, and social events for the high school. A Grad Committee organizes the Grade 12 graduation.

Tempo has a prolific Speech and Debate team whose members have won numerous medals at regional and provincial speech and debate tournaments, in English and French. The school hosts an intramural debate tournament for junior high students before the winter holiday, as well as the George Cormack Invitational Debate Tournament for senior high debaters across Edmonton. Some students also participate in the High School Model United Nations, where Tempo has been quite successful.

References

External links 
 Tempo School website

Educational institutions established in 1963
High schools in Edmonton
1963 establishments in Canada